Joseph Addison Alexander (April 24, 1809 – January 28, 1860) was an American clergyman and biblical scholar.

Early life
He was born in Philadelphia, Pennsylvania on April 24, 1809, the third son of Archibald Alexander and Janetta Waddel Alexander, brother to James Waddel Alexander and William Cowper Alexander. He graduated at the College of New Jersey (now Princeton University) with the first honor, in the class of 1826, having devoted himself especially to the study of Hebrew and other languages.

Career
He thereupon, in connection with Robert Bridges Patton, established Edgehill seminary at Mercer County, New Jersey, and in 1830 he was made adjunct professor of ancient languages in Princeton College, holding the professorship until 1833. In 1834, he became an assistant to Dr. Charles Hodge, professor of oriental and biblical literature in the Princeton Theological Seminary, and in 1838, he became associate professor of oriental and biblical literature there, succeeding Dr. Hodge in that chair in 1840 and being transferred in 1851 to the chair of biblical and ecclesiastical history, and in 1859 to that of Hellenistic and New Testament literature, which he occupied until his death at Princeton on January 28, 1860.

Alexander was distinguished in Oriental scholarship as well as in biblical learning, and was a thorough master of the modern European languages. He had been ordained as a Presbyterian minister in 1839, and was well known for his pulpit eloquence. He was the author of The Earlier Prophecies of Isaiah (1846), The Later Prophecies of Isaiah (1847), and an abbreviation of these two volumes, Isaiah Illustrated and Explained (2 vols., 1851), The Psalms Translated and Explained (3 vols., 1850), Commentary on Acts (2 vols., 1857) and Commentary on Mark (1858). After his death there appeared his two volumes of Sermons (1860), Commentary on Matthew (1861) and Notes on New Testament Literature (1861). Henry Carrington Alexander prepared a biography first published in 1869.

He was elected to the American Philosophical Society in 1845.

References

Citations

Sources
  Alt URL

External links
Photographic tour of Joseph Addison Alexander's grave at Princeton Cemetery.

1809 births
1860 deaths
American Calvinist and Reformed theologians
American Presbyterians
People from Princeton, New Jersey
Burials at Princeton Cemetery
Princeton Theological Seminary faculty
Princeton University alumni
Princeton University faculty
Educators from Philadelphia
American biblical scholars
Bible commentators